Marijan (also Romanized as Marījān) is a village in Behrestagh Rural District, in the Central District of Amol County, Mazandaran Province, Iran. At the 2006 census, its population was 28, in 7 families.

References 

Populated places in Amol County